was a Japanese magazine under the Dengeki Hobby brand published by ASCII Media Works (formerly MediaWorks) centering on information relating to plastic models and toys. It first went on sale on 25 November 1998. There was a Chinese version published by Ching Win Publishing, Taiwan.

On 21 May 2015 it was announced that the magazine would end its print publication with the July 2015 issue, shifting to an online presence as Dengeki Hobby Web.

Published articles
Armored Core Retribution
Advance of Z Titans no Hata no Motoni
Busō Shinki o Asobitsukuse! Shinki Kore Machi
Capsule-toy vending machine Gundam Getters
Dengeki Hobby Brive Generation (related to the Brave series)Dengeki Hobby OtomegumiDengeki Hobby SatelliteDengeki Hobby Yōgo JitenDengeki Robot MuseumDengeki Tokusatsu Tsūshin PlusG.T.R. (Gundam Terminal Report)Gekkan All That ZoidsHagane no KonKanzen Shōri DaiteiōMacross The RideMM Box (reader corner)Mobile Suit Gundam SEED Astray BMobile Suit Gundam SEED C.E. 73: Stargazer Phantom Pain ReportMobile Suit Gundam SEED Destiny AstrayNegima! 3D (figure corner)Puha Plastic Model no PuReader's WorksRyōhei Odai no Nanda? My MissionSukusuku ScratchSuper Robot Taisen: Original GenerationSuper Robot Wars SuperstationUltraman in the Real: Nichijō no Naka no UltramanValvrave the Liberator: UndertakerVirtual On Fragmentary Passage''

References

External links
''Dengeki Hobby Web''' 
MediaWorks' page on Dengeki Hobby Magazine 

1998 establishments in Japan
2015 disestablishments in Japan
ASCII Media Works magazines
Defunct magazines published in Japan
Magazines established in 1998
Magazines disestablished in 2015
Magazines published in Tokyo
Manga magazines published in Japan
Monthly manga magazines published in Japan
MediaWorks magazines